Manuel Luis Quezon y Molina,   (19 August 1878 – 1 August 1944), also known by his initials MLQ, was a Filipino lawyer, statesman, soldier, and politician who served as president of the Commonwealth of the Philippines from 1935 until his death in 1944. He was the first Filipino to head a government of the entire Philippines (as opposed to the government of previous Philippine states), and is considered to have been the second president of the Philippines, after Emilio Aguinaldo (1899–1901), whom Quezon defeated in the 1935 presidential election.

During his presidency, Quezon tackled the problem of landless peasants in the countryside. His other major decisions include the reorganization of the islands' military defense, approval of a recommendation for government reorganization, the promotion of settlement and development in Mindanao, dealing with the foreign stranglehold on Philippine trade and commerce, proposals for land reform, and opposing graft and corruption within the government. He established a government-in-exile in the U.S. with the outbreak of World War II and the threat of Japanese invasion. Scholars described Quezon's leadership as a 'de facto dictatorship'  and that he was "the first Filipino politician to integrate all levels of politics into a synergy of power", having removed his term limits as president and turning the Senate into an extension of the executive through constitutional amendments.

Quezon died of tuberculosis at Saranac Lake, New York during his exile. He was buried in the Arlington National Cemetery until the end of World War II, when his remains were moved to Manila. His final resting place is the Quezon Memorial Circle.

In 2015, the Board of the International Raoul Wallenberg Foundation approved a posthumous bestowal of the Wallenberg Medal upon President Quezon and to the people of the Philippines for having reached out, between 1937 and 1941, to the victims of the Holocaust. President Benigno Aquino III and then-94-year-old Maria Zenaida Quezon Avanceña, the daughter of the former president, were informed of this recognition.

Early life and career

Quezon was born on 19 August 1878 in Baler in the district of El Príncipe (now Baler, Aurora). His parents were Lucio Quezon y Velez (died 1898) and María Dolores Molina (1840–1893). Both his parents were primary grade school teachers, though his father was a retired sargento de Guardia Civil (sergeant of the Spanish Civil Guard). His father spoke and taught Spanish as a teacher.

According to historian Augusto de Viana and as written in his timeline on the history of Baler, Quezon's father, Lucio, was a Chinese mestizo who came from the Parián (Chinatown district outside Intramuros) in Paco, Manila, though learned how to speak Spanish presumably in his time in the Spanish Guardia Civil and eventually married his mother who was a Spanish mestiza born through a Spanish priest, Father Jose Urbina de Esparragosa, who arrived in Baler in 1847 serving as the town's parish priest.

Although both his parents must have contributed to his education, he received most of his primary education from the public school established by the Spanish government in his village, as part of the establishment of the free public education system in the Philippines, as he himself testified during his speech delivered in the House of Representatives of the United States during the discussion of the Jones Bill, in 1914. He later boarded at the Colegio de San Juan de Letran where he completed secondary school and graduated with the highest honors.

In 1899, Quezon left his law studies at the University of Santo Tomas to join the independence movement. During the Philippine–American War, he was an aide-de-camp to Emilio Aguinaldo. He rose to the rank of Major and fought in the Bataan sector. However, after surrendering in 1900 wherein he made his first break in the American press, Quezon returned to the university and passed the bar examinations in 1903, achieving fourth place.

He worked for a time as a clerk and surveyor, entering government service as an appointed fiscal (treasurer) for Mindoro and later Tayabas. He became a municipal councilor of Lucena and was elected governor of Tayabas in 1906 after a hard-fought election.

Congressional career

House of Representatives (1907–1916)

In 1907, he was elected as representative of Tayabas's 1st district for the first Philippine Assembly – which later became the House of Representatives – where he served as majority floor leader and chairman of the committee on rules as well as the chairman also of the committee on appropriations. From 1909 to 1916, he served as one of the Philippines' two resident commissioners to the U.S. House of Representatives, lobbying for the passage of the Philippine Autonomy Act or Jones Law.

Senate (1916–1935)

Quezon returned to Manila in 1916 and was elected senator of the Fifth Senatorial District. He was later elected Senate President by his peers, serving continuously until 1935 (19 consecutive years), the longest serving in history, until his younger province-mate from Tayabas, Senator Lorenzo Tañada's four consecutive terms (24 years from 1947 to 1972). He headed the first Independent Mission to the U.S. Congress in 1919 and secured the passage of the Tydings–McDuffie Act in 1934. In 1922, Quezon became the leader of the Nacionalista Party alliance Partido Nacionalista-Colectivista.

Presidency

Administration and cabinet

First term (1935–1941)

In 1935, Quezon won the Philippines' first national presidential election under the banner of the Nacionalista Party. He obtained nearly 68% of the vote against his two main rivals, Emilio Aguinaldo and Gregorio Aglipay. Quezon was inaugurated in November 1935. He is recognized as the second President of the Philippines. However, in January 2008, House Representative Rodolfo Valencia of Oriental Mindoro filed a bill seeking instead to declare General Miguel Malvar as the second Philippine President, having directly succeeded Aguinaldo in 1901.

Supreme Court appointments 
President Quezon was given the power, under the Reorganization Act, to appoint the first all-Filipino cabinet in the Philippines in 1935. From 1901 to 1935, although a Filipino was always appointed chief justice, the majority of the members of the Supreme Court were Americans. Complete Filipinization was achieved only with the establishment of the Commonwealth of the Philippines in 1935. Claro M. Recto and José P. Laurel were among Quezon's first appointees to replace the American justices. The membership in the Supreme Court increased to 11: a chief justice and ten associate justices, who sat en banc or in two divisions of five members each.

 Ramón Avanceña – 1935 (Chief Justice) – 1935–1941
 José Abad Santos – 1935
 Claro M. Recto - 1935–1936
 José P. Laurel – 1935
 José Abad Santos (Chief Justice) – 1941–1942

Government reorganization
To meet the demands of the newly established government set-up and in compliance with the provisions of the Tydings-McDuffie Act, as well as the requirements of the Constitution, President Quezon, true to his pledge of "More Government and less politics", initiated a reorganization of the government bodies. To this effect, he established the Government Survey Board to study the existing institutions and in the light of the changed circumstances, make the necessary recommendations.

Early results were seen with the revamping of the Executive Department. Offices and bureaus were either merged with one another or outrightly abolished. Some new ones, however, were created. President Quezon ordered the transfer of the Philippine Constabulary from the Department of Interior, to the Department of Finance. Among the changes in the Executive Departments by way of modification in functions or new responsibilities, were those of the National Defense, Agriculture and Commerce, Public Works and Communications, and Health and Public Welfare.

In keeping with other exigencies posed by the Constitution, new offices and boards were created either by Executive Order or by appropriate legislative action. Among these were the Council of National Defense, the Board of National Relief, the Mindanao and Sulu Commission, and the Civil Service Board of Appeals.

Social justice program
Pledged to improve the lot of the Philippine working class and taking inspiration from the social doctrines of Pope Leo XIII and Pope Pius XI as well as the authoritative treatises of the world's leading sociologists, President Quezon started a vigorous program of social justice, which he introduced through appropriate executive measures and legislation obtained from the National Assembly.

Thus, a court of Industrial Relations was established to mediate disputes, under certain conditions, minimizing the inconveniences of the strikes and lockouts. A minimum wage law was enacted, as well as a law providing for an eight-hour work day and a tenancy law for the Filipino farmers. Another measure was the creation of the position of Public Defender to help poor litigants in their court suits.

Commonwealth Act No. 20 authorized Quezon to institute expropriation proceedings and/or acquire large landed estates to re-sell them at nominal cost and under easy terms to tenants thereon, thus enabling them to possess a lot and a home of their own. It was by virtue of this law that the Buenavista estate was acquired by the Commonwealth Government. Quezon also launched a cooperative system of agriculture among the owners of the subdivided estates in order to alleviate their situation and to provide them greater earnings.

In all these, Quezon showed an earnest desire to follow the constitutional mandate on the promotion of social justice.

Economy
Upon the creation of the Commonwealth, the economic condition of the nation was stable and promising. With foreign trade reaching a peak of four hundred million pesos, the upward trend in business was accentuated and assumed the aspect of a boom. Exports crops were generally good and, with the exception of tobacco, they were all in high demand in foreign trade markets. Indeed, the value of the Philippine exports reached an all high of 320,896,000 pesos, the highest since 1929.

Additionally, government revenues amounted to 76,675,000 pesos in 1936, as compared with the 1935 revenue of 65,000,000 pesos. Even the government companies, with the exception of the Manila Railroad, managed to earn profits. Gold production increased about 37% and iron nearly 100%, while cement production augmented by some 14%.

Notwithstanding this prosperous situation, the government had to meet certain economic problems besetting the country. For this purpose, the National Economic Council was created. This body advised the government in economic and financial questions, including promotion of industries, diversification of crops and enterprises, tariffs, taxation, and formulation of an economic program in the preparation for the future independent Republic of the Philippines.

Again, a law reorganized the National Development Company; the National Rice and Corn Company (NARIC) was created and was given a capital of four million pesos.

Upon the recommendation of the National Economic Council, agricultural colonies were established in the country, especially in Koronadal, Malig, and other appropriate sites in Mindanao. The government, moreover, offered facilities of every sort to encourage migration and settlement in those places. The Agricultural and Industrial Bank was established to aid small farmers with convenient loans on easy terms. Attention was also devoted to soil survey, as well as to the proper disposition of lands of the public domain. These steps and measures held much promise for improved economic welfare.

Agrarian reform

When the Commonwealth Government was established, President Quezon implemented the Rice Share Tenancy Act of 1933. The purpose of this act was to regulate the share-tenancy contracts by establishing minimum standards. Primarily, the Act provided for better tenant-landlord relationship, a 50–50 sharing of the crop, regulation of interest to 10% per agricultural year, and a safeguard against arbitrary dismissal by the landlord. However, because of one major flaw of this law, no petition for the Rice Share Tenancy Act was ever presented.

The major flaw of this law was that it could be used only when the majority of municipal councils in a province petitioned for it. Since landowners usually controlled such councils, no province ever asked that the law be applied. Therefore, Quezon ordered that the act be mandatory in all Central Luzon provinces. However, contracts were good for only one year. By simply refusing to renew their contract, landlords were able to eject tenants. As a result, peasant organizations clamored in vain for a law that would make the contract automatically renewable for as long as the tenants fulfilled their obligations.

In 1936, this Act was amended to get rid of its loophole, but the landlords made its application relative and not absolute. Consequently, it was never carried out in spite of its good intentions. In fact, by 1939, thousands of peasants in Central Luzon were being threatened with wholesale eviction.

The desire of Quezon to placate both landlords and tenants pleased neither. By the early 1940s, thousands of tenants in Central Luzon were ejected from their farmlands and the rural conflict was more acute than ever.

Indeed, during the Commonwealth period, agrarian problems persisted. This motivated the government to incorporate a cardinal principle on social justice in the 1935 Constitution. Dictated by the social justice program of the government, expropriation of landed estates and other landholdings commenced. Likewise, the National Land Settlement Administration (NLSA) began an orderly settlement of public agricultural lands. At the outbreak of the Second World War, major settlement areas containing more than 65,000 hectares were already established.

Educational reforms
Turning his attention to the matter of education in the country, President Quezon by virtue of Executive Order No. 19, dated 19 February 1936, created the National Council of Education, with Rafael Palma, former President of the University of the Philippines, as its first chairman. Funds retained from the early approved Residence Certificate Law were devoted to the maintenance of the public schools all over the nation and the opening of many more to meet the needs of the young people. Indeed, by this time there were already 6,511 primary schools; 1,039 intermediate schools; 133 secondary and special schools; and five junior colleges. The total number of pupils enrolled was 1,262,353, who were placed under the charge of 28,485 schools teachers. That year's appropriation for public education amounted to 14,566,850 pesos. The private institutions of learning, for their part, accommodated more than ninety seven thousand students, thus considerably aiding the government in solving the annual school crisis. To implement the pertinent constitutional provision, the Office of Adult Education was also created.

Women's suffrage

President Quezon initiated women's suffrage in the Philippines during the Commonwealth Era. As a result of the prolonged debate between the proponents of women's suffrage and their opponents, the Constitution finally provided that the issue be resolved by the women themselves in a plebiscite. If no less than 300,000 of them were to affirmatively vote in favor of the grant within two years, it would be deemed granted the country's women. Complying with this mandate, the government ordered a plebiscite to be held for the purpose on 3 April 1937.

Following a rather vigorous campaign, on the day of the plebiscite, the turnout of female voters was impressive. The affirmative votes numbered 447,725, as against 44,307 who opposed the grant.

National language
Another constitutional question of the Philippines was that of the country's national language. Following a year's study, the Institute of the National Language – established in 1936 – recommended that Tagalog be adopted as the basis for the national language. The proposal was well received, considering that the Director – the first to be appointed – at the time, Jaime C. de Veyra, was an ethnic Waray.

In December 1937, Quezon issued a proclamation approving the constitution made by the Institute and declaring that the adoption of the national language would take place two years hence. With the presidential approval, the Institute of National Language started to work on a grammar and dictionary of the language.

Visits to Japan (1937–1938)
As the Imperial Japan started to encroach the Philippines, President Quezon witfully and skillfully, avoided antagonizing both the American officials and on the other side, the Japanese officials. In fact, he visited Japan twice in his term as president. First was a three-day trip from January 31 to February 2 in 1937 then the other one was on June 29 until July 10, 1938. His meeting with the Japanese officials made clear that despite his cordial dialogue with them, he would be very loyal to the United States, while reassuring them that he would protect all the rights and privileges of Japanese residents in the Philippines. It could be presumed that Quezon's visit to Japan ultimately sending a beacon or a message wherein the Philippines could become a neutral nation in an event of a Japan-American conflict, should America become indifferent to the concerns of his country.

Council of State
In 1938, President Quezon enlarged the composition of the Council of State through Executive Order No. 144. This highest of advisory bodies to the President was henceforth to be composed of the President, the Vice-President, Senate President, House Speaker, Senate President pro tempore, House Speaker pro tempore, Majority Floor leader of both chambers of Congress, former Presidents of the Philippines, and some three to five prominent citizens.

1938 midterm election

The elections for the Second National Assembly were held on 8 November 1938, under a new law that allowed block voting which favored the governing Nacionalista Party. As expected, all the 98 seats of the National Assembly went to the Nacionalistas. José Yulo, who was Quezon's Secretary of Justice from 1934 to 1938, was elected Speaker.

The Second National Assembly embarked on passing legislation strengthening the economy. Unfortunately, the cloud of the Second World War loomed over the horizon. Certain laws passed by the First National Assembly were modified or repealed to meet existing realities. A controversial immigration law that set an annual limit of 50 immigrants per country, which affected mostly Chinese and Japanese nationals escaping the Sino-Japanese War, was passed in 1940. Since the law bordered on foreign relations it required the approval of the U.S. president which was nevertheless obtained. When the result of the 1939 census was published, the National Assembly updated the apportionment of legislative districts, which became the basis for the 1941 elections.

1939 plebiscite
On 7 August 1939, the United States Congress enacted a law embodying the recommendations submitted by the Joint Preparatory Commission on Philippine Affairs. Because the new law required an amendment of the Ordinance appended to the Constitution, a plebiscite was held on 24 August 1939. The amendment was carried by 1,339,453 votes against 49,633.

Third official language

Quezon established the Institute of National Language (INL) to create a national language for the country. On 30 December 1937, President Quezon, through Executive Order No. 134, officially declared Tagalog as the basis of the national language of the Philippines. The national language was compulsorily taught in schools for the 1940–1941 academic year. The National Assembly later enacted Law No. 570 raising the national language elaborated by the institute to the status of official language of the Philippines, at par with English and Spanish, effective 4 July 1946, upon the establishment of the Philippine Republic.

1940 plebiscite

Coincident with the local elections for the 1940, another plebiscite was held this time to ratify the proposed amendments to the Constitution regarding the restoration of the bicameral legislature, the presidential term, which was to be fixed at four years with one re-election; and the establishment of an independent Commission on Elections. With the Nacionalista Party, which had proposed said amendment in their convention, working hard under the leadership of its party president, Speaker Jose Yulo, the amendments were overwhelmingly ratified by the electorate. Speaker Yulo and Assemblyman Dominador Tan traveled to the United States to obtain President Franklin D. Roosevelt's approval, which was given on 2 December 1940. Two days later President Quezon proclaimed the amendments.

1941 presidential election

Quezon had originally been barred by the Philippine constitution from seeking re-election. However, in 1940, constitutional amendments were ratified allowing him to seek re-election for a fresh term ending in 1943. In the 1941 presidential election, Quezon was re-elected over former Senator Juan Sumulong with nearly 82% of the vote.

Second term (1941–1944)

Pre-war talks
As crisis mounted in the Pacific, Philippines also prepares for war. The military youth training, under General Douglas MacArthur, was intensified. Blackout practices were held, the first of which happened on the night of 10 July 1941 in Manila. First aid was taught on all schools and social clubs. On 1 April 1941, President Quezon built the Civilian Emergency Administration (CEA), with branches on provinces and towns. Also, air raid drills were established.

Jewish refugees
In a notable humanitarian act, Quezon, in cooperation with United States High Commissioner Paul V. McNutt, facilitated the entry into the Philippines of Jewish refugees fleeing fascist regimes in Europe while taking on critics who were convinced by fascist propaganda that Jewish settlement was a threat to the country. Quezon and McNutt proposed to have 30,000 refugee families on Mindanao, and 30,000-40,000 refugees on Polillo. Quezon gave, as a 10-year loan to Manila's Jewish Refugee Committee, land beside Quezon's family home in Marikina. The land would house homeless refugees in Marikina Hall, which is currently the Philippine School of Business Administration, dedicated on 23 April 1940.

Government-in-exile

After the Japanese invasion of the Philippines during World War II, he evacuated to Corregidor, where he was formally inaugurated for his second term, then the Visayas and Mindanao. Upon the invitation of the US government, he was further evacuated to Australia, and then to the United States, where he established the Commonwealth government in exile with headquarters in Washington, D.C.. There, he served as a member of the Pacific War Council, signed the declaration of the United Nations against the Axis Powers, and wrote his autobiography, The Good Fight.

To carry on the government duties in exile, President Quezon hired an entire floor of one wing of the Shoreham Hotel to accommodate his family and his office. The offices of the government were established at the quarters of the Philippine Resident Commissioner, Joaquin Elizalde. The latter was made a member of the President's wartime Cabinet. Others likewise appointed were Brigadier-General Carlos P. Romulo, as Secretary of the Department of Information and Public Relations, and Jaime Hernandez as Auditor General.

On 2 June 1942, President Quezon addressed the United States House of Representatives, impressing upon them the vital necessity of relieving the Philippine front. Before the Senate, later, the Philippine President reiterated the same message and urged the senators to adopt the slogan "Remember Bataan". Despite his precarious state of health, President Quezon roamed the States to deliver timely and rousing speeches calculated to keep the Philippine war uppermost in the minds of the American nation.

Talks of post-war Philippines

On the occasion of his first birthday celebration in the United States, Manuel Quezon broadcast a radio message to the Philippine residents in Hawaii, who contributed to the celebration by purchasing four million pesos worth of World War II bonds. Further showing the Philippine government's cooperation with the war effort, Quezon officially offered the U.S. Army a Philippine infantry regiment, which was authorized by the U.S. Department of War to train in California. He also had the Philippine government acquire Elizalde's yacht, which, renamed Bataan and crewed by Philippine officers and sailors, was donated to the United States for use in the war.

Early in November 1942, Quezon held conferences with President Roosevelt to work out a plan for the creation of a joint commission to study the economic conditions of post-war Philippines. Eighteen months later, the United States Congress would pass an Act creating the Philippine Rehabilitation Commission as an outcome of such talks between the two Presidents.

Quezon-Osmeña impasse
By 1943, the Philippine government-in-exile was faced with a serious crisis. According to the 1935 Constitution, the official term of President Quezon was to expire on 30 December 1943 and Vice-President Sergio Osmeña would automatically succeed him to the presidency. This eventuality was brought to the attention of President Quezon by Osmeña himself, who wrote the former to this effect. Aside from replying to this letter informing Vice-President Osmeña that it would not be wise and prudent to effect any such change under the circumstances, President Quezon issued a press release along the same line. Osmeña then requested the opinion of U.S. Attorney General Homer Cummings, who upheld Osmeña's view as more in keeping with the law. Quezon, however, remained adamant. He accordingly sought President Roosevelt's decision. The latter chose to remain aloof from the controversy, suggesting instead that the Philippine officials themselves solve the impasse.

A cabinet meeting was then convened by President Quezon. Aside from Quezon and Osmeña, others present in this momentous meeting were Resident Commissioner Joaquín Elizalde, Brig. Gen. Carlos P. Romulo, and his cabinet secretaries, Andrés Soriano and Jaime Hernandez. Following a spirited discussion, the Cabinet supported Elizalde's opinion favoring the decision, and announced his plan to retire in California.

After the meeting, however, Osmeña approached Quezon and broached his plan to ask the United States Congress to suspend the constitutional provisions for presidential succession until after the Philippines had been liberated. This legal way out was agreeable to Quezon and the members of his cabinet. Proper steps were taken to carry out the proposal. Sponsored by Senator Tydings and Congressman Bell, the pertinent resolution was unanimously approved by the Senate on a voice vote and passed the House of Representatives by a vote of 181 to 107 on 10 November 1943.

Death

Quezon suffered from tuberculosis and spent his last years in hospitals, such as at a Miami Beach Army hospital in April 1944. That summer, he was at a "cure cottage" in Saranac Lake, New York. He died in that cottage at 10:05 a.m. on 1 August 1944 , less than three weeks shy of his 66th birthday. He was initially buried in Arlington National Cemetery. Quezon's remains were then moved to Quezon City within a miniature copy of Napoleon's tomb at the Quezon Memorial Shrine on 1 August 1979.

Electoral history

Personal life

Quezon was married to his first cousin, Aurora Aragón Quezon, on 17 December 1918. The couple had four children: María Aurora "Baby" Quezon (23 September 1919 – 28 April 1949), María Zenaida "Nini" Quezon-Avanceña (9 April 1921 – 12 July 2021), Luisa Corazón Paz "Nenita" Quezon (17 February – 14 December 1924) and Manuel L. "Nonong" Quezon, Jr. (23 June 1926 – 18 September 1998). His grandson, Manuel L. "Manolo" Quezon III (born 30 May 1970), a prominent writer and former undersecretary of the Presidential Communications Development and Strategic Planning Office, was named after him.

Awards and honors
Foreign Honors
: : Légion d'honneur, Officier
: : Order of the Aztec Eagle, Collar
: : Order of the Crown, Grand Cross
 Spain: : Orden de la República Española, Grand Cross
: : Order of Brilliant Jade, Grand Cordon

National Honors

: Order of the Golden Heart, Grand Collar (Maringal na Kuwintas) - posthumous (19 August 1960) 

: The Order of the Knights of Rizal, Knight Grand Cross of Rizal (KGCR).
Manuel L. Quezon Day (19 August) – celebrated throughout the entire Philippines as a special working holiday with the exception of the Provinces of Quezon and Aurora, Quezon City, and City of Lucena where it shall be a special non-working holiday.

Legacy
 Quezon City, the Quezon Province, Quezon Bridge in Manila and the Manuel L. Quezon University, and many streets are named after him. The highest honor conferred by the Republic of the Philippines is the Quezon Service Cross. He is also memorialized on Philippine currency. He appears on the Philippine twenty peso bill. He also appears on two commemorative one peso coins (1936), one alongside Frank Murphy and another with Franklin Delano Roosevelt.
 The "Open Doors" is a Holocaust memorial in Rishon LeZion, Israel.
 Municipalities in six different provinces of the Philippines are named after Quezon: Quezon, Bukidnon; Quezon, Isabela; Quezon, Nueva Ecija; Quezon, Nueva Vizcaya; Quezon, Palawan; and Quezon, Quezon.
 The Presidential Papers of Manuel L. Quezon was officially inscribed in the UNESCO Memory of the World Register in 2011.
 Quezon Island, the most developed island in the Hundred Islands National Park, is named after him.

In popular culture
 Portrayed by Richard Gutierrez in the 2010 official music video of the Philippine national anthem produced by and aired over GMA Network.
 Portrayed by Arnold Reyes in the musical MLQ: Ang Buhay ni Manuel Luis Quezon (2015).
 Portrayed by Benjamin Alves in the film Heneral Luna (2015).
 Portrayed by Benjamin Alves and TJ Trinidad in the film Goyo: Ang Batang Heneral (2018).
 Portrayed by Raymond Bagatsing in the film Quezon's Game (2019).

Recording of speech
A sample of Quezon's voice is preserved in the recording of a speech entitled "Message to My People", delivered in English and Spanish. According to Manuel L. Quezon III, his grandfather's speech was recorded when he was President of the Senate "in the 1920s, when he was first diagnosed with tuberculosis and assumed he didn't have much longer to live."

See also
List of Asian Americans and Pacific Islands Americans in the United States Congress
List of Hispanic Americans in the United States Congress
First inauguration of Manuel L. Quezon

Notes

References

External links

 Bonnie Harris, Cantor Joseph Cysner: From Zbaszyn to Manila.
 Online E-book of Future of the Philippines : interviews with Manuel Quezon by Edward Price Bell, The Chicago Daily News Co., 1925
 Online E-book of Discursos del Manuel L. Quezon, comissionado residente de Filipinas, pronunciados en la cámara de representantes de la discusión del Bill Jones (26, Septiembre-14, Octubre, 1914), published in Manila, 1915
 
 Manuel L. Quezon on the Presidential Museum and Library 
 The Good Fight, autobiography, published 1946
 

 
1878 births
1944 deaths
20th-century deaths from tuberculosis
Burials at Arlington National Cemetery
Filipino city founders
Colegio de San Juan de Letran alumni
Exiled politicians
Filipino exiles
Filipino expatriates in the United States
Filipino Freemasons
Filipino military leaders
Filipino people of Spanish descent
Filipino people of Chinese descent
Filipino politicians of Chinese descent
Filipino revolutionaries
Governors of Quezon
Hispanic and Latino American members of the United States Congress
History of the Philippines (1898–1946)
Tuberculosis deaths in New York (state)
Majority leaders of the House of Representatives of the Philippines
Members of the House of Representatives of the Philippines from Quezon
Members of the United States Congress of Filipino descent
Military history of the Philippines during World War II
Nacionalista Party politicians
People from Aurora (province)
Candidates in the 1935 Philippine presidential election
Candidates in the 1941 Philippine presidential election
Knights Grand Cross of the Royal Order of Cambodia
Officiers of the Légion d'honneur
People from Quezon
People from Saranac Lake, New York
People of the Philippine Revolution
People of the Philippine–American War
Presidents of the Nacionalista Party
Presidents of the Philippines
Presidents of the Senate of the Philippines
Manuel
Resident Commissioners of the Philippines
Secretaries of National Defense of the Philippines
Senators of the 5th Philippine Legislature
Senators of the 6th Philippine Legislature
Senators of the 7th Philippine Legislature
Senators of the 8th Philippine Legislature
Senators of the 9th Philippine Legislature
Senators of the 10th Philippine Legislature
Tagalog people
University of Santo Tomas alumni
World War II political leaders
Filipino independence activists